St Helen's Church, Ainderby Steeple is a Grade I listed parish church in the Church of England in Ainderby Steeple, North Yorkshire.

History

The church dates from the first half of the fourteenth century. An earlier church, thought to be 12th century, occupied the site but this was rebuilt in around 1320. The tower was re-built in the 15th century and the church underwent restoration in 1870.

Parish status
The church is in a joint parish with
St Andrew's Church, Great Fencote
St Wilfrid's Church, Great Langton
St Mary's Church, Kirkby Fleetham
St John the Baptist's Church, Kirby Wiske
St Radegund's Church, Scruton
All Saints' Church, Yafforth

Organ

The organ was built in 1889 by Forster and Andrews at a cost of £320 and was opened on 8 April 1890 by Robert Mack, organist of Catterick Parish Church. A specification of the organ can be found on the National Pipe Organ Register.

References

Ainderby
Ainderby